LCCHS may refer to:
La Costa Canyon High School
LaSalle Community Comprehensive High School in Quebec